, also romanized as Zeroin, is a Japanese manga series released in 2004 by Sora Inoue, serialized in Monthly Dragon Age magazine, and published in Japan by Kadokowa Comics Dragon Junior. It is published in French by Pika Editions, in German by Egmont Manga & Anime, in South Korea by Haksan Publishing, and in Italy by Flashbook Edizioni.

Story
In the near future, the Japanese National Police Agency covertly establishes an armed division called Minkei or Private Police in order to stamp out rampant crimes involving firearms by heavily armed criminals and terrorists. Minkei's recruitment methods focus mainly on ability and as such it is willing to take in anyone that displays the aptitude to handle the work.

Zero In follows cases and interactions of the Light Knight B squad of Kou, Mikuru, Kina (deceased), Fujita, Hana and Shikie. The story mainly focuses on the two main protagonists Kou and Mikuru, with various chapters giving more in-depth focus on their partners. Mikuru's relationships both within and without Minkei are a prime story focus as are the roller-coaster ride of her developing relationship with Kou, the way she handles her life in the two differing worlds of a high school idol and a Minkei officer, and her very physical rivalry with the older Shikie.

Kou undergoes considerable growth, going from being the weak kid that's always bullied to a considerably popular and confident young man who still agonizes over his crush on Mikuru and fear of rejection if he confesses, as well as trying to keep his professional life as a Minkei officer out of his personal life as a high school student.

Main characters
Kou Shiraishi
Kou Shiraishi is an average 16-year-old high school student from a family of police officers. Because of feelings of inferiority with regards to his older brother, Gaku, his mild personality made him a prime target for the school bullies. He joins Minkei after the school idol Mikuru, who's also a part of the force, rescues him twice.

The training he receives builds an inner core of confidence and his exceptional performance in assessing tactical situations gets him assigned as a Keeper. His general friendly personality endears him to many at Minkei, and even the usually brusque Misono develops a degree of fondness for the younger man. He also passively pursues his relationship with Mikuru alternately confused by her bouts of jealousy, to irritated by her secretive nature about her past. As of volume 12, they've shared their first kiss after Kou began to actively pursue her.

Mikuru Nazume
A 16-year-old high school girl. A product of childhood tragedy, Mikuru possesses several distinct personalities. The face of the school idol, friendly yet aloof. And her true personality of an angry and bitter young woman. The third, and seldom seen, killer personality which only rears its head under extreme emotional distress. Forced to kill her father, whom she adored, she became withdrawn and introverted.

Trained from a young age to fight and shoot, she is adept user of the Zero In martial arts style, which she uses to incapacitate criminals. Unwilling to kill, she nonetheless is highly regarded and surprisingly well-liked within Minkei. Softened by Kou's attraction and friendship, she finds herself slowly drawn into a small circle of friends at school, which she finds herself beginning to enjoy, rather than it just being a cover. Less enjoyable, however, were the feelings of jealousy towards any woman that showed an interest in Kou whose newfound confidence was drawing attention.

As of volume 12, Kou has made his intentions towards her clear and they share their first kiss.

Gaku Shiraishi
The eldest son of the Shiraishi family, and the youngest police commissioner at 28 years of age. He rarely ever shows his face at home, even avoiding the celebration of his father's thirty years on the police force. Kou deeply resents Gaku's aloofness referring to him as "that guy" to Ayuna's distress. He is currently under pressure due to the discovery of teenagers within Minkei and appears to have been creating a rival task force.

He is last seen talking to Shikie, ostensibly for the purpose of recruiting her, or having her keep tabs on Kou.

Ayuna Shiraishi
The 15-year-old sister of Kou who is a genius at cooking and displays her happiness and affection for her brother by karate-chopping his head. During their childhood, Kou would regularly protect her from bullies, resulting in constant cuts and bruises. Because of this, she possesses a tame brother complex. She is also developing rapidly, outgrowing her bras.

She is very popular and gets along well with Mikuru and referred to Kina as "sensei" when she realised Kina's cooking was even better than her own. She was devastated at her loss.

Ayuna later was targeted by the same man that killed Kina in another attempt to bring "life" to his dolls. Though Kou failed to rescue her, he left his phone on, taping the conversation and allowing Mikuru to hear where they were being taken. Shikie followed his phone's GPS, which was now in Mikuru's hands, leading to a brief scuffle before they joined forces (in a manner of speaking) to deal with the kidnapper. She fully supports her brothers pursuit of Mikuru.

Kina Monjou
An 18-year-old member of Minkei, she was partnered with Kou during the training program a few times. She had an attraction to him due to a habit they shared. Her grandfather was part of the yakuza and was killed along with everyone else in the household by the hitman, Black Dogg. She was hidden at the time and despises yakuza and hitmen. In combat she uses either guns, or a special sword that she is skilled enough with to cut a car in half. Along with Kou and Mikuru, they finally captured Black Dogg, but she was shot in the stomach and spent some time in the hospital. Afterward she retired from Minkei and was planning to go back to her family's home, but while wearing only normal clothing and not carrying any weapons, she was shot and killed by her stalker, who made it look like a mugging, in order to bring his dolls to "life". Ironically, one of Kina's favorite saying is "I'm immortal".

Her hobbies were cooking, and she was on-par with Kou's sister. She gave Kou her treasure after hearing that he loves Mikuru.

Shikie Misono
An elite officer from the Police Force brought in ostensibly to be Mikuru's partner. Sparks however flew from the onset as Shikie relishes killing criminals as opposed to Mikuru's reluctance. Since losing her first partner to gangsters Shikie has little patience for protocol and has several bounties on her head. She immediately dismisses Mikuru and Kou as kids playing at being cops and the situation finally explodes into a savage brawl that leaves both women battered and unconscious.

Temporarily assigned to Kou, she finds herself drawn to the younger man's earnestness and gives him his first kiss. Now permanently assigned to Hana Tomozou, she and Mikuru have made a degree of peace which is merely the swapping of the festering hate to a rather intense and very physical rivalry.

Hana Tomozou
Fresh from the Minkei training academy, he is in the team two months after Kina's death. He likes to refer to himself as "Ross" and gives nicknames to others. He seems to be trigger happy but doesn't kill. He usually paired up with Shikie Misono and calls her "Russian".

While not in Mikuru and Shikie's league, he is still surprisingly capable as an officer and also a skilled ping pong player, being a national champion while in high school. He attempts to use this to gain respect from the two women, only to be knocked out by Mikuru so that she and Shikie could go against each other. He attempts to impart his wisdom on the feminine mind to Kou, having taken an interest in Kou and Mikuru's relationship informing him that her constant jealousy is a positive indicator. Despite this his own romance life is pretty much nonexistent.

Fujita Nanami
13th division leader of Minkei, age 33. She's married and has a child. She's the most trusted member of the 13th division and is referred to as "Leader". Her true strength is currently unknown since while she has long been able to cow Mikuru and even Shikie is loath to antagonise her, she has also been seen to be intimidated while witnessing Mikuru training. During the strip ping pong match, she somehow defeated both Mikuru and Shikie brutally, claiming Kou as her prize.

Loyal to those under her, she is usually capable of reading her subordinates. Initially pairing Mikuru with Shikie as the most effective team, she quickly changed the assignments after she realised that her plan for them to rage themselves out was a failure. Stating they're like cat and dog, she goes as far as to wish Kou luck whenever he attempts to break up their scuffles.

This is a direct contradiction of her home life, as she is depicted to be very relaxed and a slob at home.

Secondary characters
Tsuyuka Nazume
Mikuru's mother, a world-renowned gunsmith, and terrible cook. She is overjoyed when Mikuru displays an interest in boys and is possibly over her father complex. She is the weapon designer for much of Minkei's hardware. She quickly picks up on Kou being the one Mikuru is interested in from her reactions when he stops over for a visit, while Mikuru's girlfriends are over. Attempting to spare Mikuru embarrassment, she declares him to be a no blood related sibling. Which causes even more harm.

Due to her house been raided several times by gangs looking for guns, she has express permission from the local precinct to discharge her guns inside the building, so long as she record all information.

Happiest when using the guns she loves, she is described by the men she shoots as the virgin Mary.

The Shu
Minkei's top agent who was in pursuit of a notorious hitman known simply as "202". When he located him, he requested Mikuru and Yuuji accompany him. A close friend of Yuuji who'd been handling guns since the age of 5, he turned out to be hitman 202, regarding all hunts as "training". Initially in control, he lost it when Mikuru reverted to her previous mindset before she met Kou, and committed suicide after Mikuru beat him while telling her that she was "just like him".

Yuuji Hisamaki
The instructor at Minkei Training ground, he's tough but a knowledgeable trainer. He's a Zero-Master and is capable of seeing and blocking Mikuru's "Zero In: Burst". He was suitably impressed by Kou's development and command potential recommending him to Fujita's Light Knight's B squad. Before dismissing Kou, however, he gave him a taste of what a Zero user could do. Ostensibly he did this after seeing how well Kou and Mikuru worked together. Another meaning would be that he felt Kou had the potential to learn it.

He is chain smoker and is almost never seen without a cigarette between his teeth.

Araki Kazutahito
A police officer who is constantly seen as the one enlisting Minkei's help to catch panty thieves (or other perverts), he takes credit when he does nothing and sees Mikuru and Kina as monsters (due to the excessive damage they cause) but he does show concern for them. In chapter 18 he leaves flowers at the place Kina was killed, saying how losing her was unbearable.

Nomihara Noriko
A girl attending Kou's school, she's first seen in chapter 15, being robbed and after Kou saved her, she seems to have a crush on him. Very clumsy, she is a source of constant jealousy for Mikuru as Kou is too good natured to leave her be, and too thick to notice her crush on him. Nicknamed No-No, she joins Mikuru's small circle of girlfriends, and gives up on Kou when she realises how well Mikuru understands him.

Sakura Sonobe
A school friend of Mikuru who writes eromanga for young girls. She takes inspiration from Mikuru, who gets scared by how accurately Sonobe recreates her Minkei life.

She is commonly seen either doodling her manga or wandering around school grounds aimlessly until inspiration hits her. Unfortunately for her small circle of friends, she will often resort to using them for inspiration if the need arises. Such a situation occurs in chapter 41 where she cons her friends into the "man diet". Using Kou (Ayuna was her freshman) she garners inspiration from the activity of the bikini clad girls and the clearly flustered young man.

After a beatdown from her enraged friends Sonobe is seen working on her next manga, while Kou has apparently lost considerable weight.

Fast Frog
A courier service of two sisters that transport anything and anyone. Kou was mistaken for Hyodo Tanaka, the brother of an upcoming yakuza boss and taken by them. When the mistake was discovered, Kou covered for the pair, pretending to be their "brother" allowing them time to grab with right person. The younger (13) Mana starts calling him Oniichan (older brother) while the elder is shown blushing while talking to him. They are last seen transporting Snake and Witch after they beat Minkei during the department store hostage situation.

Mana uses a variation of the Zero-In style and Kou notices that she's even faster than Mikuru.
The elder possesses a considerable strength, able to almost crush a man's head with one hand.
Their car is heavily modified to avoid pursuit (an obvious play on The Transporter).
They operate out of a church in the slums with a one-eyed sister as their intermediary.

References

External links
 Official Page 
 

Shōnen manga
Fujimi Shobo manga